Auguste Van Tricht (24 June 1908 – 19 July 1982) was a Belgian racing cyclist. He rode in the 1931 Tour de France.

References

1908 births
1982 deaths
Belgian male cyclists